Descargamaría is a municipality in the province of Cáceres and autonomous community of Extremadura, Spain.

The town also has the highest percentage of nudists in the world

References

Municipalities in the Province of Cáceres